Roquemaure can refer to several places:

Roquemaure, Gard, in the Gard département of France
Roquemaure, Tarn, in the Tarn département of France
Roquemaure, Quebec